Ischyrodon is a dubious genus of large, carnivorous marine reptile belonging to the Pliosauroidea, a clade of short-necked plesiosaurs and it is known from the Middle Jurassic (Callovian) of Wölflinswil, Switzerland. The type species is I. meriani, and was previously listed as a synonym of Liopleurodon ferox.

Ischyrodon was named in 1838 and described in 1856 by Hermann von Meyer. Lambert Beverly Tarlo noted the possibility of it pertaining to Liopleurodon in 1960. A 2022 study by Daniel Madzia and colleagues noted that while the tooth likely came from Liopleurodon or something similar, there was too little information available to make a confident assignment, so they treated Ischyrodon as a nomen dubium and did not synonymise Ischyrodon with Liopleurodon.

See also

 List of plesiosaur genera
 Timeline of plesiosaur research

References

Pliosaurids
Middle Jurassic plesiosaurs of Europe
Fossil taxa described in 1838
Fossil taxa described in 1856
Sauropterygian genera